Simon Stewart may refer to:
Simon Stewart (footballer) (born 1973), English football defender
Simon Patrick Stewart (born 1980), coach and shot putter

See also
 Simon Steward (disambiguation)
 Simeon Stuart (1864–1939), British film actor
 Simon Stuart (disambiguation)